Melville Brown may refer to:

 Sir Melville Richmond Brown, 3rd Baronet (1866–1944) of the Brown Baronets
 Melville W. Brown (1887–1938), American film director
Penny Melville-Brown, Royal navy veteran and blind activist

See also
 Mel Brown (disambiguation)
 Brown (surname)